May 26 - Eastern Orthodox Church calendar - May 28

All fixed commemorations below celebrated on June 9 by Orthodox Churches on the Old Calendar.

For May 27th, Orthodox Churches on the Old Calendar commemorate the Saints listed on May 14.

Saints
 Hieromartyr Therapont of Sardis, Bishop, by beheading (259)
 Martyr Julius the Veteran, at Dorostolum in Moesia (297)
 Virgin-martyr Theodora, and Martyr Didymus the Soldier, of Alexandria (304)
 Martyr Eusebiotus, by fire.
 Martyr Alypius, by stoning.
 Martyr Juliana.
 Hieromartyr Helladios, Bishop (4th century)
 Saint Michael of Parekhi, Georgia (8th-9th century)
 Saint Basil of Khakhuli, son of King Bagrat III (11th century)

Pre-Schism Western saints
 Saint Restituta and Companions (272)
 Saint Eutropius of Orange (475)
 Venerable Melangell of Wales, Abbess (590)
 Martyr Ranulf (Ragnulf), in Thélus near Arras in France (700)
 Venerable Bede the Confessor, Hieromonk of Wearmouth-Jarrow (735)
 Saint Bruno of Würzburg, Bishop of Würzburg (1045)

Post-Schism Orthodox saints
 Venerable Therapont of White Lake, Abbot of Byelozersk (White Lake) and Mozhaisk (1426)
 Saint Philip I, Metropolitan of Moscow (1473)
 Venerable Therapont of Monza, Abbot of Monza (1597)
 Venerable Hiero-schema-monk Lazarus of Pskov-Caves Monastery (1824)
 Saint John the Russian the Confessor, whose relics are on the island of Euboea (1730)

Other commemorations
 Translation of the relics (1472) of Sts. Cyprian (1406), Photius (1431), and Jonah (1461), Metropolitans of Kiev.
 Translation of the relics (1667) of Venerable Nilus of Stolobny Island (1554)
 Blessed Zina of Vetluga (1960)

Icon gallery

Notes

References

Sources 
 May 27/June 9. Orthodox Calendar (PRAVOSLAVIE.RU).
 June 9 / May 27. HOLY TRINITY RUSSIAN ORTHODOX CHURCH (A parish of the Patriarchate of Moscow).
 Complete List of Saints. Protection of the Mother of God Church (POMOG).
 May 27. OCA - The Lives of the Saints.
 Dr. Alexander Roman. May. Calendar of Ukrainian Orthodox Saints (Ukrainian Orthodoxy - Українське Православ'я).
 May 27. Latin Saints of the Orthodox Patriarchate of Rome.
 May 27. The Roman Martyrology.
Greek Sources
 Great Synaxaristes:  27 ΜΑΪΟΥ. ΜΕΓΑΣ ΣΥΝΑΞΑΡΙΣΤΗΣ.
  Συναξαριστής. 27 Μαΐου. ECCLESIA.GR. (H ΕΚΚΛΗΣΙΑ ΤΗΣ ΕΛΛΑΔΟΣ). 
Russian Sources
  9 июня (27 мая). Православная Энциклопедия под редакцией Патриарха Московского и всея Руси Кирилла (электронная версия). (Orthodox Encyclopedia - Pravenc.ru).
  27 мая (ст.ст.) 9 июня 2013 (нов. ст.). Русская Православная Церковь Отдел внешних церковных связей. (DECR).

May in the Eastern Orthodox calendar